1998 Uganda Cup was the 24th season of the main Ugandan football Cup.

Overview
The competition was known as the Kakungulu Cup and was won by SC Villa who beat SC Simba 2-0 in the final. Hassan Mubiru scored a brace for SC Villa dribbling past Fred Kajoba the Express keeper on two occasions and finishing clinically.

Quarter-finals
The 4 matches in this round were played between 7 October and 10 October 1998.

Semi-finals
The semi-finals were played on 15 September 1998.

Final

Footnotes

External links
 Uganda - List of Cup Finals - RSSSF (Mikael Jönsson, Ian King and Hans Schöggl)

Ugandan Cup
Uganda Cup
Cup